Platelet endothelial cell adhesion molecule (PECAM-1) also known as cluster of differentiation 31 (CD31)  is a protein that in humans is encoded by the PECAM1 gene found on chromosome17q23.3. PECAM-1 plays a key role in removing aged neutrophils from the body.

Structure 
PECAM-1 is a highly glycosylated protein with a mass of approximately 130 kDa. The structure of this protein was determined by molecular cloning in 1990, when it was found out that PECAM-1 has N-terminal domain with 574 amino acids, transmembrane domain with 19 amino acids and C-terminal cytoplasmic domain with 118 amino acids. The N-terminal domain consists of six extracellular Ig-like domains.

Interactions 
PECAM-1 is a cell-cell adhesion protein which interacts with other PECAM-1 molecules through homophilic interactions or with non-PECAM-1 molecules through heterophilic interactions. Homophilic interactions between PECAM-1 molecules are mediated by antiparallel interactions between extracellular Ig-like domain 1 and Ig-like domain 2. These interactions are regulated by the level of PECAM-1 expression. Homophilic interactions occur, only when the surface expression of PECAM-1 is high. Otherwise, when expression is low, heterophilic interactions occur.

Tissue distribution 
CD31 is normally found on endothelial cells, platelets, macrophages and Kupffer cells, granulocytes, lymphocytes (T cells, B cells, and NK cells), megakaryocytes, and osteoclasts.

Immunohistochemistry 

In immunohistochemistry, CD31 is used primarily to demonstrate the presence of endothelial cells in histological tissue sections. This can help to evaluate the degree of tumor angiogenesis, which can imply a rapidly growing tumor. Malignant endothelial cells also commonly retain the antigen, so that CD31 immunohistochemistry can also be used to demonstrate both angiomas and angiosarcomas. It can also be demonstrated in small lymphocytic and lymphoblastic lymphomas, although more specific markers are available for these conditions.

Function 

PECAM-1 is found on the surface of platelets, monocytes, neutrophils, and some types of T-cells, and makes up a large portion of endothelial cell intercellular junctions. The encoded protein is a member of the immunoglobulin superfamily and is likely involved in leukocyte transmigration, angiogenesis, and integrin activation. CD31 on endothelial cells binds to the CD38 receptor on natural killer cells for those cells to attach to the endothelium.

Role in signalling 
PECAM-1 plays a role in signalling. In cytoplasmic domain of PECAM-1 are serine and tyrosine residues which are suitable for phosphorylation. After the tyrosine is phosphorylated, PECAM-1 recruits Src homology 2 domain–containing signalling proteins. Then these proteins can initiate signalling pathways. Of all these proteins, mostly SH2 domain–containing protein-tyrosine phosphatase interacts with the PECAM-1 cytoplasmic domain. Signalling through PECAM-1 leads to the activation of neutrophils, monocytes and leukocytes.

Leukocyte transmigration 
PECAM-1 is involved in migration of monocytes and neutrophils, natural killer cells, Vδ1+ γδ T lymphocytes and CD34+ hematopoietic progenitor cells through the endothelial cells. Moreover, PECAM-1 is involved in transendothelial migration of recent thymic emigrants to the secondary lymphoid organs. Mechanism of leukocyte transmigration can be explained by creating a homophilic interaction. In this interaction migrating leukocytes express PECAM-1 on the surface and then they react with PECAM-1 on the surface of endothelial cell.

Angiogenesis 
PECAM-1 is also important for angiogenesis because it enables the formation of new blood vessels through the cell-cell adhesion.

Role of CD31 in diseases

Cancer 
PECAM-1 is expressed by many solid tumor cell lines such as hemangioma, angiosarcoma, Kaposi’s sarcoma, breast carcinoma, glioblastoma, colon carcinoma, skin carcinoma and other tumor cell lines. On the surface of these tumor cells PECAM-1 mediates the adhesion to endothelial cells. PECAM-1 modulates tumor growth by the formation of new endothelial cell tubes. In mice, this process can be inhibited using an anti-PECAM-1 antibody. 

Recently, it was found out that elderly patients with gastric cancer have high concentration of PECAM-1 in the serum. That suggests that the use of a serum PECAM-1 level can be a good prognostic marker.

Atherosclerosis 
Inhibition of PECAM-1 leads to a reduction of atherosclerotic lesions in mice. That means that PECAM-1 is involved in atherosclerosis. The exact mechanism, how PECAM-1 contributes to atherosclerosis is not known, but there are some theories. PECAM-1 can act as a mechanoresponsive molecule. Or the pathogenesis can be caused by the infiltration of leukocytes mediated by PECAM-1. Finally, polymorphisms in the PECAM-1 gene can lead to the progression of atherosclerosis.

Disseminated intravascular coagulation 
Extensive microvascular thrombosis and increased microvascular permeability are main characteristics of disseminated intravascular coagulation, a fatal complication of sepsis. Patients with this devastating condition have high levels of PECAM-1 in the serum indicating PECAM-1 as a good diagnostic marker. Moreover, PECAM-1 can protect from the development of disseminated intravascular coagulation by inhibiting macrophage pyroptosis.

Neuroinflammation 
PECAM-1 contributes to at least two of the nervous system diseases, multiple sclerosis and cerebral ischaemia. First signs of multiple sclerosis are defects in the blood brain barrier and leukocyte migration mediated by adhesion molecules such as PECAM-1. Moreover, monocytes in patients with multiple sclerosis express high level of PECAM-1. Cerebral ischaemia is caused by the accumulation of leukocytes, which then infiltrate brain parenchyma and release toxic compounds such as oxygen radicals. Interactions between leukocyte and endothelium are mediated by PECAM-1. High levels of soluble PECAM-1 can be used to diagnose both diseases. Increased PECAM-1 levels indicate damage in the blood brain barrier in patients with multiple sclerosis and high PECAM-1 levels can be used as a short-term prediction of a stroke in patients with cerebral ischaemia.

References

Further reading

External links 
 Human CD Antigen Chart (eBioscience)
 Mouse CD Antigen Chart (eBioscience)
 
 

Clusters of differentiation